Grefe is a surname. Notable people with the surname include:

John Grefe (1947–2013), American chess player
Ted Grefe (1917–1989), American football player
William Grefe (born 1930), American film director